Crooked may refer to:

 Crooked Creek (disambiguation)
 Crooked Island (disambiguation)
 Crooked Lake (disambiguation)
 Crooked River (disambiguation)
 Crooked Harbour, Hong Kong
 Crooked Forest, West Pomerania, Poland
 Crooked Bridge, a railroad bridge in Saskatchewan, Canada
 Crooked Media, an American left-wing political media company
 The Crooked Castle, part of the Vilnius Castle Complex, Vilnius, Lithuania
 Crooked (album), by Kristin Hersh
 "Crocked", a 2006 film directed by Art Camacho
 "Crooked", a 2008 song by Evil Nine
 Crooked, original title of Game (2011 film), a Hindi action thriller
 "Crooked", a 2013 song by G-Dragon
 Crooked, a 2015 novel by Austin Grossman

See also
 Crooked I, stage name of American rapper Dominick Wickliffe
 Crook (disambiguation)